George Anthony Perez (born September 9, 1972) is an American actor

Filmography

References

External links
 

1972 births
Living people
American male film actors
Mexican emigrants to the United States